Title XXX of the New Hampshire Revised Statutes Annotated has to do with laws and regulations regarding occupations and professions, and how they're practiced within the state. The title includes RSA Chapters 309–322, although many of these have been repealed and diverged into separate, individual sub-RSAs.

RSA 331
This chapter, formerly about Real estate issues, was repealed and diverged into RSA 331a, which regards Real estate practices and RSA 331b, which is in regard to  court reporters.

RSA 331a
The main rules in regard to  Real estate agents in New Hampshire, RSA 331a is separated into 35 subchapters, 331a:1 to 331a:35. RSA 331a is the main impetus of the regulations of the New Hampshire Real Estate Commission, the licensing and disciplinary body for Real estate agents in the state.

See also
New Hampshire Real Estate Commission

New Hampshire statutes